The Metropolitan Police Department of the City of St. Louis (also known as the SLMPD or Metro) is the primary law enforcement agency for the U.S. city of St. Louis.

According to the Mapping Police Violence dataset, SLMPD has the highest police use of deadly force per capita. The SLMPD union has strongly resisted attempts to establish independent oversight of police misconduct. When Kimberly Gardner, the top prosecutor in St. Louis, sought to establish a unit within her office to independently investigate police misconduct, the leader of the SLMPD union said Gardner should be removed "by force or by choice."

History

The Metropolitan Police Department was established in 1808, five years after St. Louis became part of the United States. The department was created with only four officers, who received no pay. Able-bodied men age 18 and older were required to patrol for four months of the year. This was the only police system for the next 10 years. Refusal to serve on patrol carried a fine of $1.

In 2013, CALEA recognized the Metropolitan Police Department with it distinguished Tri-Arc Award. The Tri-Arc Award is reserved for those police agencies that have successfully accredited their law enforcement services, police academy and communications division.

The MPDSL is a division in the Public Safety Department - City of St. Louis. With approximately 1,343 officers and 462 civilian staff, it is the 34th municipal police department in the United States. Established on August 7, 1808, the SLMPD is one of the oldest police departments in the United States. The Metropolitan Police is the second largest municipal police agency in Missouri, based on number of employees, city population, and geographic area served.

From April 28, 1836, to August 29, 2020, the Officer Down Memorial Page reported that 170 officers in the St. Louis Metropolitan Police Department have died in the line of duty.

Demographics
The composition of the department's total personnel, according to the 2020 annual report, was:

 Sex — Male: 83.54%, Female: 16.46%
 Race — White: 66.0%, African-American/Black: 30%, Other: 3.51%

Salary
Starting salary for a Metropolitan police officer is $47,815, increasing to a maximum of $70,387.

Union representation 
Officers are represented by the St. Louis Police Officers Association (SLPOA). SLPOA employs author and former Arnold police officer Jeff Roorda as business manager. In the 2017 city mayoral election, incumbent Lyda Krewson called for Roorda to be fired due to social media comments directed at candidate Tishaura Jones and declared that he would not be welcomed in her office if elected.

The St. Louis Ethical Society of Police (ESOP), formerly known as St. Louis Black Police Officers Association until 1975, represents African American police officers by providing legal counsel and other benefits; however, the SLPOA is the only recognized bargaining unit for officers.

Controversies 
Officers with the SLMPD have been accused of several incidents of alleged police misconduct, obstruction of justice, violations of civil rights, and racial prejudice. Several of these controversial incidents have resulted in criminal charges against SLMPD officers, and some cases have resulted in guilty pleas.

Shooting of Anthony Lamar Smith (2017) 
See: Shooting of Anthony Lamar Smith

Assault of undercover officer Luther Hall  (2018) 
Three St. Louis police officers from its Civil Disobedience Team were charged with felony assault against undercover police officer Luther Hall during the 2017 St. Louis protests. Officer Hall, according to the November 2018 indictment, had been extensively assaulted by the three officers. According to the prosecutors, officers Christopher Myers, Randy Hays, and Dustin Boone used excessive force in the form of kicking Hall and beating him with their police batons. Hall stated that the officers smashed his cell phone and broke a camera he had used to document the protests.  Hall's injuries as a result of the assault included an injured tailbone, two herniated discs, and a jaw injury that prevented Hall from eating, resulting in a twenty-pound weight loss. Prosecutors obtained text messages from the officers involved, which revealed the officers' excitement at the prospect of brutalizing protesters. Officer Boone allegedly texted "it’s gonna be a lot of fun beating the hell out of those shitheads once the sun goes down and nobody can tell us apart!!!!” and “Did everyone see the protesters getting FUCKED UP in the galleria????? That was awesome.”

A fourth police officer, Bailey Colletta, was charged with providing false testimony to a grand jury. Colletta pled guilty to giving false testimony to cover up the attack on Hall, and admitted she had lied to the FBI and to a federal grand jury.

All four officers were suspended without pay.

Officer Hays, who allegedly had texted "going rogue does feel good", pled guilty to assault. Hays admitted that on the evening of September 17, although Hays did not witness anything probable cause to arrest Hall, Hays and other officers arrested Hall. During the arrest, Hall was compliant and pinned to the ground, with Officer Boone's knee on Hall's shoulder and continually pushing down Hall's head while telling him not to look at them; during this time, officers kicked Hall in the face and beat him with a baton.

An indictment released in December 2019 revealed that a fifth officer, Steve Korte, was also charged for violently beating Hall, and then lying to the FBI about his involvement. He was placed on administrative leave without pay. Officer Korte was later unanimously found not guilty by the jury, after evidence was shown in trial proving he was nowhere near Luther Hall when he was attacked. Officer Korte was later reinstated by the St. Louis Metropolitan Police Department.

Hall filed a federal civil rights lawsuit in September 2019 against the police and against the city.

"Exclusion List" controversy (2019–2020) 
A controversy ensued in 2019 regarding the existence of a list created by circuit attorney Kimberly M. Gardner's office of 28 Metropolitan Department officers that were to be excluded from acting as witnesses in future prosecutions due to an alleged history of misconduct. In late September 2020, fifteen more officers were added to the list. This would indicate about five percent of the sworn officers of the department are listed. The names of those on the list has not been released to the public.

"Russian Roulette" incident (2019) 
On January 24, police arrived at the residence of SLMPD officer Nathaniel Hendren following reports of gunshots, upon arrival police found 24-year-old officer Katlyn Alix fatally shot in the chest, following an alleged game of Russian roulette. St. Louis circuit attorney Kimberly Gardner criticized the investigation, stating that the department was obstructing the investigation of the shooting, claiming investigators refused to allow a sample of Officer Hendren's blood be tested for alcohol and other substances. St. Louis Metropolitan Police Commissioner John Hayden Jr. responded to criticism of the investigation as unfounded.

Plain View Project findings (2019) 
In June 2019 officers and employees from numerous police departments in the United States were found to have participated in a number of private groups on Facebook that shared content that was described as racist, violent, and Islamophobic. This information was published online by the Plain View Project, which had viewed and documented the social-media accounts of 2,900 officers from eight separate departments, finding twenty percent of those users posted material that was determined to meet the threshold of being offensive. At least 22 officers in the department were found to have participated in the closed groups, St. Louis Circuit Attorney Kimberly M. Gardner stated that these officers would be added to a list of officers who have been determined to be unable to provide witness testimony in criminal prosecutions.

Office of the Police Commissioner

The Commissioner of Police serves as the senior sworn member of the SLMPD. Prior to 1806, the position was known as the chief inspector and as the chief of police before thahe circumstances."t. The Commissioner is the overall person in charge of the police department.

Colonel Robert J. Tracy is the 36th individual to hold the post as Commissioner of Police.

Rank structure

Police Officer (Trainee) is the initial rank of oncoming Metropolitan Police officers, held while undergoing training at the Metropolitan Police Academy.

Police Commissioner
Police Commissioner of the St. Louis Metropolitan Police Department is an office held by the highest-ranking member of the Metropolitan Police Department.  St. Louis has had 36 police chiefs (including interim chiefs) since 1861.  For a full list of past and current police commissioners, visit the Commissioner of the St. Louis Metropolitan Police Department page.

Lieutenant Colonel

Lieutenant Colonels command the Bureaus of Investigative Services, Support Operations, and Community Policing and Auxiliary Services.

Lieutenant Colonel Ronnie Robinson, Office of the Police Commissioner

Lieutenant Colonel Michael Sack,  Office of the Police Commissioner

Majors 

The rank of Major is the third-highest rank in the Department, reporting directly to a Lieutenant Colonel. Each Major serves as a member of the Senior Command staff and assists each Lieutenant Colonel in managing civilian and commissioned personnel within their assigned areas.

Major Renee Kriesmann, Commander of Bureau of Community Policing 
 
Major Shawn Dace, Commander of Bureau of Auxiliary Services

Major Eric Larson, Commander of Bureau of Support Operations

Major Ryan Cousins, Commander of the Bureau of Investigative Services

Major Janice Bockstruck, Commander of the Bureau of Specialized Enforcement

Police Officer 
All potential candidates for the position of Police Officer must undergo a written examination, oral board panel and review, physical agility testing, psychological screening, drug testing and intensive background investigation. The number of candidates accepted is less than 25 percent of overall applicants. New officers are hired as probationary employees at the rank of Police Trainee. Upon successful completion of the six-month police academy, they are appointed as a probationary Police Officer. Upon successful completion of 3 months of field training and an additional 1-year probationary period, they attain their full rank.

Police Fleet

The department utilizes a variety of vehicles, including the Ford Police Interceptor, Ford Crown Victoria Police Interceptor (CVPI), the Dodge Charger, the Chevrolet Tahoe, the Chevrolet Silverado 1500 and 2500 series, the Chevrolet Impala 9C1, the Chevrolet Caprice, and the Ford F-150 and F-250. Both regularly marked and slicktop vehicles are used frequently. Each officer is issued the Beretta 92D 9mm handgun which has been standard issue since 1992. As of 2017 it was reported that the department would be getting new 9mm Beretta pistols to replace the currently issued aging 92D.

Patrol cars
 Chevrolet Impala
 Chevrolet Tahoe
 2017 Explorer (DWI Enforcement)
 Chevrolet Malibu

Miscellaneous
 John Deere Gator
 Police Motorcycle
 Bicycles
 Ford Super Duty

Specialized Enforcement
 Lenco BearCat
 S.W.A.T Mobile Command
 Chevrolet Tahoe
 Chevrolet Step-Van
 2017 Explorer

Bureaus
The department is divided into four bureaus and an office. which are typically commanded by a Lieutenant colonel or Major. The bureaus fit under five umbrellas: Investigative Services, Support Operations, and Community Policing and Specialized Enforcement and Auxiliary Services. Bureaus are often subdivided into smaller divisions and units

Bureau of Community Policing

The Bureau of Community Policing is led by Major Renee Kriesmann

The City of St. Louis is divided geographically into three area patrol stations and six police districts and 6 substations. Each patrol division is commanded by a major and each district is commanded by a captain.

South Patrol Division

Central Patrol Division

North Patrol Division

Television
The homicide detectives of SLMPD will be featured in A&E's reality series The First 48.

See also

 List of law enforcement agencies in Missouri

References

External links
 

Government of St. Louis
Municipal police departments of Missouri
Organizations based in St. Louis
1808 establishments in the United States
 
1808 establishments in the Louisiana Territory